Kingsley Ozumba Mbadiwe  (1915–1990) was a Nigerian nationalist, politician, statesman and government minister in the Nigerian First Republic.

Early life
Mbadiwe was born to the family of Mbadiwe Odum from Arondizuogu then under then Orlu division of present-day Imo State. His uncle, Igwegbe Odum, was a warrant chief in the colonial era.

Education 
He started primary education at St Mary's Catholic School, Port Harcourt, and finished it at a government school in Aba. He then attended the Hope Waddell Training Institute, Calabar,  Aggrey Memorial College, Arochukwu, Igbobi College, Lagos and the Baptist Academy, Lagos. At Baptist Academy, Samuel Akintola and E.E. Esau were staff members, while some of his schoolmates at Igbobi were Taslim Elias, Horatio Thomas and Justice F.O. Coker. After his secondary education, he dabbled into trading by establishing Mbadiwe Produce Association in 1937. He left Nigeria to study at Columbia University and New York University for a number of years. While in America, he helped to establish an African student's association, through which he gained the attention of the U.S. First Lady Eleanor Roosevelt, who received him and his organization in the White House.

Career 
After returning from the U.S., he started another business and established a research institute on African Arts. He soon entered the Nigerian political scene and joined the National Council of Nigeria and the Cameroons. In 1951, he was elected into the Eastern Region House of Assembly. He was re-elected in 1954, and made minister for Lands and National Resources shortly thereafter. In 1957, he was made the Minister for Commerce. However, his political success was to undergo a great challenge when in mid-1958, he and Kola Balogun attempted to remove Dr. Nnamdi Azikiwe as the leader of National Council of Nigeria and the Cameroons (NCNC).  Mbadiwe set up his own newspaper, The Daily Telegraph, as an organ of protest. He later re-joined the party and was appointed Minister for Trade and Communications and also served as a special adviser to the Prime Minister, advising on African affairs.

Personal life 
 Mbadiwe had six children namely Betty, Greg, Paul, Chris, George, and Francis. His brother, James Green Mbadiwe was a businessman conducting on his account in the Northern Region, he owned the now defunct Green's Hotel on Ahmadu Bello Way, Kaduna built in 1939 and commissioned by Azikiwe. The property later became a shopping center, J. Green Mbadiwe died in 1980.

He built and inhabited the landmark residence, The Palace of The People, at Ndianiche Uno. It was commissioned by Prime Minister Sir Abubakar Tafawa Balewa in 1965.

References

Further reading
 Lynch, Hollis R. K.O. Mbadiwe: A Nigerian Political Biography, 1915-1990 (Palgrave Macmillan; 2012) 294 pages
 Rosalynde Ainslie, Catherine Hoskyns, Ronald Segal, Political Africa: A Who's Who of Personalities and Parties (Frederick A. Praeger, 1961)

1915 births
1990 deaths
People from Imo State
Igbo politicians
National Council of Nigeria and the Cameroons politicians
Federal ministers of Nigeria
Imo State politicians
20th-century Nigerian politicians
Columbia University alumni
Igbobi College alumni
Baptist Academy alumni
New York University alumni
People from colonial Nigeria
Hope Waddell Institute alumni